Maillardia montana, synonyms including Maillardia pendula, is a species of flowering plant in the family Moraceae, native to Mayotte, the Aldabras, and Madagascar in the western Indian Ocean. It was first described by Jacques Désiré Leandri in 1948.

Conservation
Maillardia pendula was assessed as "critically endangered" in the 1998 IUCN Red List, where it is said to be native only to the island of Grande Terre in the Aldabras. , M. pendula was regarded as a synonym of Maillardia montana, which has a wider distribution, including Madagascar.

References

Moraceae
Flora of Aldabra
Flora of the Comoros
Flora of Madagascar
Plants described in 1948